Klanac may refer to several places:

In Bosnia and Herzegovina
Klanac, Kakanj
Klanac, Trnovo
In Croatia
Klanac, Gospić
Klanac, Vrbovsko